Vi ere en Nation, vi med (English: We are a nation, we as well) is a poem written by Norwegian poet Henrik Wergeland.  Adapted as the lyrics of the Patriotic song "Smaagutternes Nationalsang,(English: National Song), the text express a desire that Norwegian Constitution Day also should be a day for the children. The most commonly used melody for the song might have been written by French Classical-period composer, André Grétry, but this has not been confirmed.

References

Other sources
Flom, George T. Scandinavian Studies and Notes (General Books LLC. 2012)) 
Grøndahl, Illit  Henrik Wergeland, the Norwegian poet (BiblioBazaar, 2009)

Other Reading
(In Norwegian)
Koht, Halvdan  Henrik Wergeland (BiblioBazaar. 2009) 
Seip, Karl En liten visebok for hjemmet (Oslo: Aschehoug. 1929)
Ustvedt, Yngvar Henrik Wergeland: en biografi (Tiden Norsk Forlag. 1975)

External links
Vi ere en Nation, vi med  (no.wikisource.org) 
Henrik Wergeland (Store norske leksikon)
Henrik Wergeland (Dokumentasjonsprosjektet)
Smaagutternes Nationalsang

Norwegian poems
Norwegian patriotic songs
Norwegian anthems
Year of song unknown